Altenberge (Westphalian: Ollenbiärg) is a municipality in the district of Steinfurt, in North Rhine-Westphalia, Germany. It is situated approximately 15 km south-east of Steinfurt and 15 km north-west of Münster.

Economy 

The machine manufacturers Schmitz and Wesseler were founded in Altenberge.

Personalities 
 Hans Blumenberg (1920-1996) German philosopher
 Herbert Vorgrimler (1929-2014) Catholic theologian and author
 Theresia Degener (born 1961),  law professor in Bochum and one of the most important German activists for the rights of people with disabilities
 Pascal Koopmann (born 1990), footballer

References

Steinfurt (district)